Ahmad Awad bin Mubarak is a Yemeni politician who is the current Foreign Minister of Yemen. He was previously the Ambassador of Yemen to the United States.

Early and personal life
Mubarak was born in 1968 in Aden. He has three children. His father was a trader.

He received a PhD in business administration from Baghdad University and is a professor at Sana'a University, where he heads the business administration center, which is cooperatively administrated by Sanaa University and Maastricht School of Management (MSM). Dr. Mubarak is attached as professor to the joint MBA program conducted by MSM and Sanaa University.

Previously, he served as consultant for numerous international projects in Yemen in education, employment and international development. He is also a member of the administrative board for the Youth Leaders Development Fund and had headed many administrative consultancies, training sessions and workshops for a number of public and private associations in Yemen, Bahrain, Burundi, Ethiopia, Romania, Netherlands, France and Germany.

At Science and Technology University in Sanaa, he had served as head of the administrative information technology and marketing and production administration departments, as well as being the manager of quality and development assurance from 2007 to 2009.

Politics

In March 2013, Bin Mubarak was elected as the secretary general of the national reconciliation dialogue conference, composed of representatives of all political parties and civic groups, tasked with carrying out reforms. It was disbanded in January 2014 after endorsing a federal political system for the country. He was then director of the president's office.

After the Saudi-backed Yemeni government bombed the north of the country, the Houthis, whose traditional homeland is in the north, near the Saudi border, protested in the capital Sanaa. Armed protesters took over government areas. This uprising led to Prime Minister Mohammed Basindwa's resignation. Ahmad Awad Bin Mubarak was promoted from Chief of Staff and appointed Prime Minister by President Abd Rabbuh Hadi despite Houthi opposition, citing a lack of an official agreement resolving the conflict. However, Ahmad withdrew from the post on 9 October 2014.

Bin Mubarak was abducted by gunmen believed to be loyal to Ali Abdullah Saleh in Sanaa on 17 January 2015. Houthi and government officials reached a deal on 21 January to end a months-long military and political standoff in the capital that was reportedly to include bin Mubarak's release, but the agreement quickly collapsed as Hadi and his ministers quit under rebel pressure. He was reportedly released in Shabwa Governorate on 27 January, ten days after his kidnapping.

On 3 August 2015, he was appointed Yemeni Ambassador to the United States.

References

1968 births
21st-century Yemeni politicians
Living people
People from Aden
People of the Yemeni Revolution
Ambassadors of Yemen to the United States
Foreign ministers of Yemen
First Maeen Cabinet
Second Maeen Cabinet